Munster Derby is the name given to a football derby contested by teams from the larger football clubs in Munster.

The term is frequently used to describe games between Cork City FC and Waterford FC, as well as games between Cork City and Limerick-based teams like Limerick FC and Treaty United. It is also occasionally used to describe games between Waterford and Limerick-based teams.

Cork v Limerick-based teams 
Football clubs based in Cork and Limerick both have strong local support. Cork City, for example, have one of the biggest support bases in the League of Ireland, and as of early 2017 had average attendances of between four and five thousand per home game, compared to a league average of approximately 1,500.

The first Munster Derby between Cork City F.C. and Limerick F.C. was played in Turners Cross in Cork for a Premier Division league match on Sunday 21 October 1984. The game ended 0-0. Limerick then won the second derby on Sunday 3 February 1985, 3-1 at Markets Field. Overall for a period of 10 years from the early 1980s to early 1990s, Limerick won more of the derby clashes. But when Limerick were relegated in 1994, they didn't meet Cork in a league match until 2010, a First Division clash on Friday 2 April 2010 at Jackman Park in Limerick. The clubs didn't meet in the league for a period, until Limerick won promotion to the Premier Division in 2012. After that, Cork had the advantage in derby results - although Limerick won several derby fixtures, including when relegation-fighting Limerick travelled to title-challengers Cork, and came out 3-2 winners. This result contributed to Dundalk FC's title win in the 2015 Premier Division.

Following the liquidation of Limerick F.C. in 2019, and the formation of Treaty United in its place in Limerick, the first meeting of Treaty United and Cork City (in the 2021 League of Ireland First Division) was billed as a "Munster derby".

Cork v Limerick results

League results (2010 - 2019)

Cup competition (2008 - 2019)

Cork v Limerick statistics (2008 to 2019)

Cork v Waterford
The derby clashes between Cork City and Waterford were mainly contested in the 2000s - when Cork and Waterford were in the Premier Division and then again when Cork City Foras entered the First Division with Waterford in the early 2010s. Derby games between Cork and Waterford  significantly declined when Cork City started challenging the top of the table in the Premier Division and Waterford dropped to the bottom end of the First Division around 2014. When the clubs would draw each other in the cups, Waterford would usually be beaten. When Waterford played Cork in Turners Cross in the EA Sports Cup in 2016 they were beaten 7-0. However the rivalry was rekindled in 2017 after a heavy challenge by Waterford's Patrick McClean on Cork's Sean Maguire caused controversy, it led to a dispute on social media between Waterford and Cork players with Irish internationals James McClean and Shane Duffy also getting involved. A move by Waterford-born Cork centre back Kenny Browne caused some controversy with Cork manager John Caulfield in 2017. Both clubs competed in the 2018 and 2019 League of Ireland Premier Division seasons.

Cork v Waterford results

League results (2005 to 2019)

Cork v Waterford statistics (2005 to 2019)

References

Derbies in the League of Ireland
Limerick F.C.
Cork City F.C.

Derby